The Helms Foundation College Basketball Player of the Year was an annual men's college basketball award given to the most outstanding men′s player in the United States. It was awarded by the Helms Athletic Foundation, an organization founded in 1936 by Bill Schroeder and Paul Helms, the owner of Helms Bakery in Los Angeles.

The award was first presented in 1944, when the Helms Athletic Foundation announced Schroeder′s player-of-the-year selection for the 1943–44 season as well as his retroactive picks for the player of the year for each season from 1904–05 to 1942–43. Schroeder then began selecting a player of the year annually.

After Paul Helms' death in 1957, his family continued supporting the foundation until 1969, when the bakeries went out of business. Schroeder found a new benefactor in United Savings & Loan, and the foundation's name became United Savings–Helms Athletic Foundation. United merged with Citizens Savings & Loan in 1973, when the foundation became the Citizens Savings Athletic Foundation. It was again renamed when First Interstate Bank assumed sponsorship and was known as the First Interstate Bank Athletic Foundation in the award's final years after 1981. Schroeder made his last player-of-the-year selection for the 1982–83 season, after which the award came to an end.

Key

NOTE: Winners prior to the 1943–44 season were selected retroactively in 1944.

Winners

See also
List of U.S. men's college basketball national player of the year awards

References

External links
Helms Foundation Player of the Year Winner at Sports-Reference.com

College basketball player of the year awards in the United States
1982 disestablishments in the United States
Awards established in 1905
1905 establishments in the United States